The West Branch of the Little Magalloway River is a  river in northern New Hampshire and northwestern Maine in the United States. It is a tributary of the Middle Branch Little Magalloway River, located in the Androscoggin River watershed of Maine and New Hampshire.

The West Branch rises in Pittsburg, New Hampshire, north of  Stub Hill, the highest point in Pittsburg. The brook-sized river drops to the east into Maine, descending another 700 feet before joining the Middle Branch of the Little Magalloway a short distance upstream from Aziscohos Lake.

See also

List of rivers of Maine
List of rivers of New Hampshire

References

Tributaries of the Kennebec River
Rivers of Oxford County, Maine
Rivers of Coös County, New Hampshire